The following is a list of composers by nationality.

Albania

 Simon Gjoni (1926–1991), composer of orchestral and piano pieces
 Tonin Harapi (1925–1991)
 Agim Krajka (born 1937), composer of the National Song Festival
 Aleksandër Peçi (born 1951)
 Çesk Zadeja (1927–1997), often nicknamed the "Father of Albanian music"

Argentina

Armenia

Australia

Azerbaijan

Belgium

Bosnia and Herzegovina

Sinan Alimanović (born 1954)
Anđelka Bego-Šimunić (born 1941)
Franciscus Bossinensis (1485–1535)
Rade Jovanović (1928–1986)
Vuk Kulenovic (1946–2017)
Mladen Milicevic (born 1958)
Dino Rešidbegović (born 1975)
Ališer Sijarić (born 1969)
Aleksa Šantić (1868–1924)
Dino Zonić (born ?)
Hanan Hadžajlić (born 1991)

Brazil

 Ernani Aguiar (born 1950)
 Jorge Antunes (born 1942)
 Antônio Francisco Braga (1868–1945), composer of operas, piano and symphonic works.
 Oscar Lorenzo Fernández (1897–1948)
 Sílvio Ferraz (born 1959)
 Antônio Carlos Gomes (1836–1896), celebrated opera composer in Italy, 19th century
 Mozart Camargo Guarnieri (1907–1993)
 José Maurício Nunes Garcia (1767–1830), composer of classical era; priest, wrote both sacred and secular music.
 Radamés Gnatalli (1906–1988)
 César Guerra-Peixe (1914–1993)
 Osvaldo Lacerda (1927–2011)
 Elias Álvares Lobo (1834–1901), composer of sacred and secular music; wrote first Brazilian opera.
 Alexandre Levy (1864–1892)
 Emerico Lobo de Mesquita (1746–1805)
 Francisco Mignone (1897–1986)
 Ronaldo Miranda (born 1948)
 Alberto Nepomuceno (1864–1920)
 Marlos Nobre (born 1939)
 José Antônio Rezende de Almeida Prado (1943–2010)
 Cláudio Santoro (1919–1989)
 Heitor Villa-Lobos (1887–1959), one of the most performed Brazilian composers worldwide
 José Carlos Amaral Vieira (born 1952)
 Edson Zampronha (born 1963)

Bulgaria

 Georgi Arnaoudov (born 1957), composer of stage, orchestral, chamber, film, vocal and piano music
 Alexandra Fol (born 1981), composer and organist, currently writing her dissertation at McGill University's Schulich School of Music
 Marin Goleminov (1908–2000), composer, violinist, conductor
 Michail Goleminov (born 1956), composer, pianist, conductor, and co-founder of music publishing house The Orange Factory
 Dobri Hristov (1875–1941), composer of choral music as well as music for the church and orchestra
 Petar Krumov (born 1934), composer, arranger, conductor and expert on Bulgarian folk music
 Filip Kutev (1903–1982), composer, arranger and founder of Bulgaria's State Ensemble for Folk Song and Dance
 Kiril Lambov (born 1955) composer, pianist, and conductor
 Milcho Leviev (1937–2019), composer, arranger, jazz performer and pianist
 Emanuil Manolov (1860–1902), composed the first Bulgarian opera Siromahkinia based on the work of Ivan Vazov with the same title
 Albena Petrovic-Vratchanska (born 1965), composer and director in Luxembourg, one of her most famous works is "Gladius"
 Anna-Maria Ravnopolska-Dean (born 1960), composer, harpist, pedagogue
 Petko Staynov (1896–1977), a founding member and first chairman of the Bulgarian Contemporary Music Society (1933), which later became the Union of Bulgarian Composers
 Veselin Stoyanov (1902–1969), composer of classical music including two symphonies
 Emil Tabakov (born 1947), composer of symphonies and concertos
 Dobrinka Tabakova (born 1980), composer
 Julia Tsenova (1948–2010), contemporary composer, pianist, jazz pedagogue
 Georgi Tutev (1924–1994), composer of contemporary classical music, one of the main representatives of Bulgarian modernism
 Pancho Vladigerov (1899–1978), a founding member of the Bulgarian Contemporary Music Society (1933)

Canada

Chile

 Víctor Jara (1932–1973), composer, pedagogue, theatre director, poet, singer-songwriter, and political activist
 Juan Orrego-Salas (1919–2019)
 Jorge Urrutia (1905–1981), composer, influenced by Claude Debussy and Maurice Ravel

China

 Du Mingxin (born 1928), composer who collaborated on the ballet Red Detachment of Women
 Nie Er (1912–1935), wrote March of the Volunteers, the national anthem of the People's Republic of China
 Qu Xiao-Song (born 1952), composer, student of Du Mingxin
 Xian Xinghai (1905–1945), composer known for the Yellow River Cantata, a patriotic song during the Second Sino-Japanese War
 Xiao Shuxian (1905–1991), composer who blended elements of Chinese folk culture with Western techniques in her music

Colombia
 Jacqueline Nova (1935–1975), pioneer on experimental music and Colombian feminist movement.

Croatia

Cyprus
 Nicolas Economou (1953–1993), composer and conductor

Czech Republic

 Antonín Dvořák (1841–1904)
 Heinrich Wilhelm Ernst (1812-1865)

Denmark

 Niels Gade (1817–1890)
 Carl Nielsen (1865–1931)

Dominican Republic

 Luis Alberti (1906–1976) composer of Merengue music
 Charytín (born 1949), significant 1970s pop music composer
 Juan Luis Guerra (born 1957) significant contemporary merengue and pop ballad composer
 Johnny Pacheco (born 1935) composer of Salsa music
 Anthony Santos (born 1981) significant bachata composer
 Sandra Zaiter (born 1943) significant children's songs composer

Ecuador
Mesías Maiguashca (born 1938)

Egypt

Sayed Darwish (1892–1923)
Mohamed El Qasabgi (1892–1966)
 Zakariya Ahmad (1896–1961)
 Mohammed Abdel Wahab (1901–1991)
 Riad Al Sunbati (1906–1981)

Estonia

 Arvo Pärt (born 1935)

Finland

France

Germany

Greece

 Jani Christou (1926–1970)
 Manos Hatzidakis (1925–1994)
 Manolis Kalomiris (1883–1962), classical composer. He was the founder of the Greek National School of Music. 
 Stefanos Korkolis (born 1960)
 Nikolaos Lavdas (1879–1940)
 Nikolaos Mantzaros (1795–1872), composer of the Greek national anthem 
 Yannis Markopoulos (born 1939)
 Thanos Mikroutsikos (1947–2019)
 Mimis Plessas (born 1924)
 Nikos Skalkottas (1904–1945), member of the Second Viennese School
 Giannis Spanos (1934–2019)
 Mikis Theodorakis (born 1925)
 Stavros Xarchakos (born 1939) 
 Iannis Xenakis (1922–2001)
 Manos Loizos (1937-1982)

Guatemala
 Ricardo Arjona (born 1964), modern pop composer

Hungary

 Béla Bartók (1881–1945), 20th-century composer, considered one of the founders of ethnomusicology
 Gábor Darvas (1911–1985), composer and musicologist
 Ernő Dohnányi (1877–1960), 20th-century composer, Variations on a Nursery Tune, Suite in F-sharp minor, Ruralia Hungarica
 Péter Eötvös (born 1944)
 Karl Goldmark (1830–1915), Romantic composer influenced by Richard Wagner
 Stephen Heller (1813–1888), Early Romantic composer and pianist
 Joseph Joachim (1831-1907)
 Zoltán Kodály (1882–1967), 20th-century composer and ethnomusicologist
 Rezső Kókai (1906–1962), composer and musicologist
 György Kurtág (born 1926), 20th-century composer
 Franz Lehár (1870–1948), 20th-century composer most known for The Merry Widow
 György Sándor Ligeti (1923–2006), 20th-century composer best known for the various pieces featured in the Stanley Kubrick films 2001: A Space Odyssey, The Shining, and Eyes Wide Shut
 Franz Liszt (1811–1886), Romantic composer-pianist, wrote a number of tone poems and extended piano technique
 Ervin Nyiregyházi (1903–1987), romantic composer-pianist
 Miklós Rózsa (1907–1995), 20th-century composer, best known for his film music
 Tibor Szemző (born 1955), composer, performer and media artist
 Leo Weiner (1885–1960), 20th-century composer of the "Fox Dance"

Iceland

India

M. Balamuralikrishna (1930–2016), carnatic music
Clarence Barlow (born 1945), contemporary art music
Sandeep Bhagwati (born 1963), contemporary art music
R.D. Burman (1939–1994), film composer, musician and singer
Sachin Dev Burman (1906–1975), music composers for Hindi movies and a Bengali singer and composer
Pritam Chakraborty (born 1971), film composer
Salil Chowdhury (1922–1995), film music composer, western classical and folk fusion music writer and arranger
Ilaiyaraja (born 1943), film composer, record producer, musician and singer
Jatin–Lalit, music composer duo
Khayyam (1927–2019), film composer
Shirish Korde (born 1945), contemporary art music
Bappi Lahiri (born 1952), film composer
Laxmikant–Pyarelal, film composer duo
Madan Mohan (born 1981), film composer, musician and singer
Nadeem-Shravan, film composer duo
Naushad (1919–2006), film composer
O.P. Nayyar (1926–2007), film composer
A. R. Rahman (born 1966 as Dilip), film composer, record producer, musician and singer
Harris Jayaraj (born 8 July 1975), Indian film composer
Yuvan Shankar Raja (born 1979), singer-songwriter, film score, and soundtrack composer
Santhosh Narayanan (born 1983), Indian film composer
Sean Roldan (born 1987), Indian musician
Darbuka Siva (born 1982), Indian musician, director and actor
Armaan Malik (born 1995), Indian composer, singer and songwriter
Amaal Malik (born 1990), Indian composer, singer and songwriter
Vivek-Mervin, Indian film composer duo
Ravi (1926–2012), film composer
Anirudh Ravichander (born 1990), singer, music director, film composer
Shankar–Ehsaan–Loy trio of record producers, musicians, multi-instrumentalists
Shankar Jaikishan, music composer duo
Naresh Sohal (1939–2018), contemporary art music
Amit Trivedi (born 1979), film composer
Param Vir (born 1952), contemporary art music

Indonesia

Otto Sidharta (born 1955), music composer
Ananda Sukarlan (born 1968)

Iran

Ireland

Italy

Japan

Latvia

Liechtenstein
Josef Rheinberger (1839–1901)

Lithuania

Luxembourg

 Jean-Marie Kieffer (born 1960)

North Macedonia

 Dimitrije Bužarovski (born 1952)
 Todor Skalovski (1909–2004)

Madagascar

 Raymond Razafimbahiny (1919–1963)

Malta

 Charles Camilleri (1931–2009), 20th century classical composer
 Carmelo Pace (1906–1993), music teacher and composer
 Robert Samut (1869–1934), composer of Malta's National Anthem, l-Innu Malti

Mexico

 Miguel Bernal Jiménez (1910–1956), 20th Century composer
 Julián Carrillo (1875–1965), discovered the 13th sound
 Ricardo Castro (1864–1907), composer and pianist
 Daniel Catán (1949–2011), composer of operas
 Carlos Chávez (1899–1978), 20th-century classical composer and conductor
 Jose Mariano Elizaga (1786–1842), composer and theoretician
 Manuel Enriquez (1926–1994), modern classical composer
 Julio Estrada (born 1943), composer and theoretician
 Blas Galindo (1910–1993), 20th-century composer
 María Grever (1884–1951), composer of romantic songs like "Júrame"
 Carlos Jiménez Mabarak (1916–1994), 20th century composer
 Agustin Lara (1897–1970), composer of romantic songs like Maria Bonita, Solamente una Vez, Granada, etc.
 Mario Lavista (born 1943), composer and writer
 Francisco López Capillas (1608–1674), composer of the Baroque
 Armando Manzanero (born 1935), singer, pianist and composer of Boleros
 Arturo Márquez (born 1950), wrote Danzón No. 2
 José Pablo Moncayo (1912–1958), composer of "Huapango"
 Melesio Morales (1839–1908), composer of the opera Ildegonda
 Conlon Nancarrow (1912–1997), wrote for player piano
 Manuel María Ponce (1882–1948), 20th-century composer
 Silvestre Revueltas (1899–1940), 20th-century classical composer of Sensemayá
 Juventino Rosas (1868–1894), composer of vals "Sobre las olas"
 Manuel de Sumaya (1678–1755), composer of the Baroque
 Eugenio Toussaint (1954–2011), contemporary jazz and classical composer
 Consuelo Velázquez (1924–2005), wrote the song "Bésame Mucho"

Mongolia

Netherlands

 Michel van der Aa (born 1970), modern classical composer
 Hendrik Andriessen (1892–1981), classical composer of symphonies, songs and organworks
 Louis Andriessen (1939–2021), modern classical composer
 Henk Badings (1907–1987), classical composer of symphonic works, songs, electro-acoustical works
 Henriëtte Bosmans (1895–1952), classical composer of instrumental music and songs
 Jan Brandts Buys (1868–1933), composer of operas and chamber music
 Johannes van Bree (1801–1857), classical composer of symphonies, orchestral works, operas, songs, chamber music
 Lex van Delden (1919–1988), modern classical composer (symphonies, vocal music)
 Bernard van Dieren (1887–1936), composer of chamber music, symphonies, vocal works
 Cornelis Dopper (1870–1939), classical composer of symphonies, operas, concertos
 Rudolf Escher (1912–1980), classical composer of songs, symphonies, chamber music
 Carel Anton Fodor (1768–1846), classical composer of symphonies, concertos
 Jan van Gilse (1881–1944), classical composer of operas, symphonies, chamber music
 Pieter Hellendaal (1721–1799), classical composer of concerti grossi, chamber music, psalms and oratorios
 Elisabeth Kuyper (1877–1953), classical composer of orchestral works, concertos, chamber music, choral music, and songs
 Guillaume Landré (1905–1968), classical composer of vocal music, operas and symphonies
 Samuel de Lange (1840–1911), classical composer of operas, organ music, symphonic works, chamber music
 Fred Momotenko (born 1970), classical composer
 Leon Orthel (1905–1885), classical composer of symphonies and chamber music
 Willem Pijper (1894–1947), classical composer of chamber music, songs, symphonic works
 Julius Röntgen (1855–1932), classical composer of symphonies, concertos, chamber music, vocal works
 Leo Smit (1900–1943), classical composer of chamber music, songs, symphonic music
 Johannes Verhulst (1816–1891), classical composer of vocal music, symphonic works
 Matthijs Vermeulen (1888–1967), classical composer of symphonies and songs
 Alexander Voormolen (1895–1980), classical composer of chamber music, piano music and orchestral works
 Bernard Zweers (1854–1924), classical composer of vocal music, orchestral works and symphonies

New Zealand

Gillian Bibby (born 1945)
Jack Body (1944–2015)
Ivan Bootham (1939–2016)
Helen Bowater (born 1952)
Dorothy Buchanan (born 1945)
Edwin Carr (1926–2003), 20th century classical
Lyell Cresswell (born 1944), 20th century classical
Eve de Castro-Robinson (born 1956)
Gareth Farr (born 1968)
Sir Dean Goffin (1918–1984), brass band composer
Peter Hobbs (born 1970)
Mihi-ki-te-kapua (?-c.1872), composer of waiata
Douglas Lilburn (1915–2001)
Andrew Perkins (born 1961)
Robert J. Pope (1865–1949), songwriter
 John Psathas (born 1966), 20th century classical
Rihi Puhiwahine Te Rangi-hirawea (?–1906), composer of waiata
John Rimmer (born 1939)
Anthony Ritchie (born 1960), 20th century classical 
Stephen Roche (born 1964), composer of film music
Michael Smither (born 1939)
Sir William Southgate (born 1941)
Ronald Tremain (1923–1998), 20th century classical
Peter van der Fluit (born 1963)
Gillian Karawe Whitehead (born 1941)
Michael Williams (born 1962), 20th century classical
Kenneth Young (born 1955)
Wayan Yudane, composer of Balinese music

Nigeria
 Joshua Uzoigwe (1946–2005), 20th century classical and Nigerian folk composer

Norway

 Torstein Aagaard-Nilsen (born 1964), composer
 Ole Bornemann Bull (1810–1880) was a Norwegian violinist and composer, wrote The Herdgirl's Sunday
 Edvard Grieg (1843–1907), Romantic composer, known for his incidental music for Peer Gynt and his Piano Concerto
 Agathe Backer Grøndahl (1847–1907), Romantic composer and pianist, contemporary of Edvard Grieg
 Kjell Habbestad (born 1955), Norwegian composer
 Johan Halvorsen (1864–1935), Norwegian composer, famous for Entry March of the Boyars and Passacaglia in G minor on a Theme by George Frideric Handel
 Hans Fredrik Jacobsen (born 1954)
 Ståle Kleiberg (born 1958), classical composer and musicologist
 Herman Severin Løvenskiold (1815–1870), Romantic composer who wrote the score for the ballet La Sylphide
 Jan Erik Mikalsen (born 1979)
 Finn Mortensen (1922–1983), Norwegian composer, famous for bringing serialism and twelve-tone music to Norway
 Arne Nordheim (1931–2010), Norwegian composer, famous for bringing the modernism and electro acoustic music to Norway. Wrote Epitaffio for orchestra and tape, the ballet The Storm and Solitaire
 Marcus Paus (born 1979), Norwegian composer who writes tonal contemporary music and who has been described as a lyrical modernist
 Rune Rebne (born 1961), Norwegian contemporary composer
 Christian Sinding (1856–1941), Norwegian composer, wrote Rustle of Spring and the Suite for Violin and Orchestra
 Johan Svendsen (1840–1911), Norwegian composer of the Romance for Violin and Orchestra and 2 Symphonies
 Olav Anton Thommessen (born 1946), Norwegian composer, famous for "A Glass Bead Game"
 Lasse Thoresen (born 1949)
 Geirr Tveitt (1908–1981)
 Fartein Valen (1887–1952), Norwegian composer writing atonal polyphonic music. Famous for Le Cimetère Marin and the Violin Concerto

Pakistan
 Nisar Bazmi (1924–2007)

Peru

 Jaime Delgado Aparicio (1943–1983), contemporary jazz, pop and film score composer
 Jose Bernardo Alcedo (1788–1878), 19th-century Peruvian romantic composer, wrote the Peruvian National Anthem
 Daniel Alomía Robles (1871–1942), romantic composer, wrote El Cóndor Pasa
 Sadiel Cuentas (born 1973), contemporary composer
 Chabuca Granda (1920–1983), singer, contemporary and folk music composer
 Rafael Leonardo Junchaya (born 1965), contemporary composer
 Celso Garrido Lecca (born 1926), contemporary composer
 Jimmy Lopez (born 1978), contemporary composer
 Clara Petrozzi (born 1965), contemporary composer
 Felipe Pinglo Alva (1899–1936), poet and songwriter, father of Música criolla
 Jorge Villavicencio Grossmann (born 1973), contemporary composer

Philippines

Poland

Portugal

 Alfredo Keil (1850–1907)
 Jaime Reis (born 1983)

Puerto Rico

Romania

Russia

Serbia

Slovakia

Slovenia

South Africa

South Korea

Spain

Sri Lanka

Sweden

 Lars-Erik Larsson (1908–1986)
 Johan Helmich Roman (1694–1758)
 Dag Wirén (1905–1986)

Switzerland

 Fritz Bovet (fl. 1845–1888), violinist, composed at least one string quartet (still in print), watchmaker, Swiss vice-counsel to Canton, China
Caroline Charrière (1960–2018), composer, flautist, choir director
 Heinz Holliger (born 1939)
 Arthur Honegger (1892–1955)
 Frank Martin (1890–1974)
 Othmar Schoeck (1886–1957)
 Andreas Vollenweider (born 1953)

Taiwan
Tyzen Hsiao (1938–2015)
Liu Shueh-Shuan 劉學軒 (born 1969), 21st century contemporary classical composer

Turkey

 Ahmed Adnan Saygun (1907–1991)
 Ulvi Cemal Erkin (1906–1972) 
 Cemal Reşit Rey (1904–1985)
 Hasan Ferit Alnar (1906–1978)
 Necil Kazım Akses (1908–1999)

United Kingdom

 Malcolm Arnold (1921–2006)
 Harrison Birtwistle (1934–2022)
 Benjamin Britten (1913–1976)
 Eric Coates (1886–1957)
 Frederick Delius (1862–1934)
 Edward Elgar (1857–1934)
 Gustav Holst (1874–1934)
 David Pentecost (born 1940)
 Henry Purcell (1659–1695)
 Ralph Vaughan Williams (1872–1958)
 William Walton (1902–1983)

United States

Ukraine

Uruguay

 Miguel del Águila (born 1957)

References

External links
Union of Belgian Composers (in Dutch and French)
Union of Bulgarian Composers